Alan Reid may refer to:

Alan Reid (artist) (born 1976), American artist
Alan Reid (footballer, born 1956), businessman and former Australian rules footballer for East Fremantle, Essendon and Geelong
Alan Reid (footballer, born 1926) (1926–1988), Australian rules footballer for Geelong
Alan Reid (Scottish footballer) (born 1980), Scottish footballer
Alan Reid (courtier) (born 1947), Treasurer to Elizabeth II of the United Kingdom
Alan Reid (cricketer) (born 1931), Australian cricketer
Alan Reid (journalist) (1914–1987), Australian political journalist
Alan Reid (musician) (born 1950), Scottish musician (ex-Battlefield Band member)
Alan Reid (politician) (born 1954), Scottish Liberal Democrat MP for Argyll and Bute
Alan Reid (mathematician) (born 1962), Scottish-American mathematician

See also
Alan Reed (disambiguation)
Alan Read (disambiguation)
Allan Read (1923–2003), bishop of Ontario
Allan Reid (disambiguation)